"Somebody" is a rock song written by Bryan Adams and Jim Vallance for Adams fourth studio album Reckless (1984). It was the second single released from the album Reckless. The song topped the Billboard Top Rock Tracks chart and peaked at number 11 on the Billboard Hot 100.

Critical reception
Stewart Mason from Allmusic said "Following the Big Rawk Anthem ('Run to You') and the Sensitive Power Ballad ('Heaven'), 'Somebody' covers the third base as a straight-ahead singalong pop song with a killer chorus. A gift to an entire generation of cover bands working the bar circuit, 'Somebody' has a chorus so simple and catchy that you can actually sing along to it even if you've never actually heard the song before, and Adams and his indispensable musical partner, Jim Vallance, helpfully point out the feasibility of said activity by incorporating a large, somewhat ragged group of backing vocalists for the lengthy vamp of a fadeout. Rather like 'Run to You,' 'Somebody' is just slightly too schematic to qualify as an all-time heartland rock classic, but it still sounds good on the radio."

Chart performance
"Somebody" was released in the winter of 1985 and became one of the most successful songs from Reckless on the American rock charts and arguably one of Adams' most recognizable and popular songs. The song was Adams' second number one hit on the Top Rock Tracks chart, where it spent two weeks, and peaked at number 11 on the Billboard Hot 100. "Somebody" reached number 13 on the Canadian singles chart and remained in the top 20 for six weeks. "Somebody" was Adams' third top 20 hit on the Canadian chart. "Somebody" was released the following month in Europe and peaked at the number 20 in Ireland and at 35 on the UK Singles Chart becoming his third single to chart in Europe.

Music videos
There are two music videos for the song. One features visual footage shot at the Massey Hall in Toronto, ON, over three nights on January 8, 9 and 10, 1985 of Adams and his band performing the song live, with the audience screaming in the background. The video was produced by Concert Productions International who used the single's soundtrack off the LP and mixed that with the sound of a taped audience.The other shows Adams walking out of a stadium and through a field, interspersed with shots of him with his guitar, as well as a woman (played by Lysette Anthony) who appears to be having relationship problems with her boyfriend; the video culminates with Adams walking out onto the field of a packed football stadium while a video of him playing the song plays on the big screen.

Track listing

Personnel 
 Bryan Adams – lead and backing vocals, lead and rhythm guitars
 Keith Scott – lead guitar, backing vocals
 Tommy Mandel – keyboards 
 Dave Taylor – bass
 Mickey Curry – drums
 Jim Vallance – percussion

Chart positions

File sharing lawsuit

"Somebody" was part of the 24 songs, for which the first file-sharing copyright infringement lawsuit brought by major record labels to be tried to a jury. Jammie Thomas, single mother of four, was found liable in a 2007 trial for downloading the 24 songs from Kazaa and ordered to pay $222,000 ($9,250/song) in damages, in a second trial, in 2009, a jury again found against Thomas, this time awarding $1,920,000 ($80,000/song) in damages.

References

1985 singles
Bryan Adams songs
Music videos directed by Steve Barron
Songs written by Jim Vallance
Songs written by Bryan Adams
A&M Records singles
Song recordings produced by Bob Clearmountain
1984 songs